The Guianan streaked antwren (Myrmotherula surinamensis) is a species of bird in the family Thamnophilidae. It is found in tropical South America where its natural habitats are subtropical or tropical moist lowland forests, tropical swamps, and heavily degraded former forest. It is a small, black and white streaked bird, the female being distinguished by its rufous-cinnamon head and buff underparts.

Taxonomy
The Guianan streaked antwren was formally described in 1788 by the German naturalist Johann Friedrich Gmelin in his revised and expanded edition of Carl Linnaeus's Systema Naturae. He placed it with the nuthatches in the genus Sitta and coined the binomial name Sitta surinamensis. Gmelin based his description on the "Surinam nuthatch" that had been described and illustrated in 1782 by the English ornithologist John Latham in his A General Synopsis of Birds. The Guianan streaked antwren is now placed in the genus Myrmotherula that was introduced in 1858 by Philip Sclater. The species is monotypic: no subspecies are recognised.

The Guianan streaked antwren was at one time considered to be the same species as the Pacific antwren (Myrmotherula pacifica) and the Amazonian streaked antwren (Myrmotherula multostriata) but differences in their plumage and voice indicate that they are separate species.

Description

The male is black with the upper parts streaked with white and two white wing bars. The underparts are whitish with a few black streaks. The female has a rufous-cinnamon head, black and white streaked upper parts, an orange-buff throat and pale buff underparts. This antwren's voice is an unmelodious rattle.

Distribution and habitat
The Guianan streaked antwren is native to the northeastern region of South America. Its range includes southern Venezuela, Suriname, Guyana, French Guiana and northern Brazil, to the north of the Rio Negro and the Amazon River.

Ecology
Most antwrens forage in small mixed-species flocks, but both this species and the Amazonian streaked antwren are usually seen in pairs. It is an active bird, usually found not far from water including in mangrove areas, searching through dense foliage for insects and spiders.

Conservation status
The Guianan streaked antwren has a wide distribution and is fairly common over parts of its range. Although its population has not been quantified, it is thought to be declining, particularly in Brazil where its habitat is being cleared to make way for cattle ranching and the cultivation of soybeans. It may not be adaptable to the breakup of its habitat into smaller areas, and for this reason, the International Union for Conservation of Nature has assessed its conservation status as being "vulnerable".

References

Guianan streaked antwren
Birds of the Guianas
Guianan streaked antwren
Guianan streaked antwren
Taxonomy articles created by Polbot